Volker Redder (born 7 June 1959) is a German politician for the FDP and since 2021 a member of the Bundestag, the federal diet.

Politics 

Redder was born 1959 in the federal city state of Bremen and studied biology and computer science. Redder also holds a PhD degree from the University of Bremen in computer science. He founded twelve companies.

Redder was a member of two committees of the Bremian state diet from 2015 to 2021 without being a member of the diet. In Bremen some committees are called "Deputationen" and regular citizens can be a member of the them if they are appointed by their respective parliament group. Since 2021 he is member of the Bundestag.

References 

Living people
People from Bremen
1959 births
Members of the Bundestag 2021–2025
21st-century German politicians